Cronius (fl. 2nd century AD) was a celebrated Neopythagorean philosopher. He was probably a contemporary of Numenius of Apamea, who lived in the 2nd century, and he is often spoken of along with him. Nemesius mentions a work of his On Reincarnation,, and Origen is said to have diligently studied the works of Cronius. Porphyry also states that he endeavoured to explain the fables of the Homeric poems in a philosophical manner. This is all we know about Cronius, although he appears to have been very distinguished among the Neopythagoreans.

Notes

External links
 Life of Plotinus by Porphyry
 

2nd-century philosophers
Neoplatonists
Neo-Pythagoreans
Ancient Roman philosophers